The Romantic Age is a 1927 American silent drama film directed by Robert Florey and starring Eugene O'Brien, Alberta Vaughn and Bert Woodruff.

Cast
 Eugene O'Brien as Stephen 
 Alberta Vaughn as Sally 
 Bert Woodruff as Tom 
 Stanley Taylor

References

Bibliography
 Munden, Kenneth White. The American Film Institute Catalog of Motion Pictures Produced in the United States, Part 1. University of California Press, 1997.

External links

1927 films
1927 drama films
Silent American drama films
Films directed by Robert Florey
American silent feature films
1920s English-language films
Columbia Pictures films
American black-and-white films
1920s American films